Manchester City F.C. (Sierra Leone), known as just Manchester City F.C. or Manchester City (Salone) in their home country, is a Sierra Leonean football club based in Freetown, Sierra Leone, currently a member of the Sierra Leone National First Division, the second highest division of football league in Sierra Leone.

Founded in 2004, the club is an offshoot of the local Manchester City F.C. supporters club, which as of 2009 was the largest non-UK based Manchester City supporters club in the world. Previously not self-sufficient, the club funds itself via using the team mini-bus, donated by UK-based supporters, as a rental taxi/coach service although all kit is donated by other Manchester City (UK) supporters clubs and the English club themselves.

History

Following a chance meeting with a British national Manchester City fan, Armani Kamara – who made the connection while selling bric-a-brac on the Freetown beaches – created a Manchester City (UK) supporters club in his home town of Freetown. Shortly after, off the back of the popularity of his supporters club, he made the decision to create two teams – a senior team and an affiliated youth side – which began playing in local leagues. Quickly, the Manchester side themselves offered to help out, and donated official match-worn 2003–04 season kits. Within a year, the youth side won its first competition, a local area cup competition.

In 2008, the club won its first national honour – the Sierra Leonean FA Youth Cup, only four seasons into its existence.

The senior team slowly worked its way into the national league system. They would then be suspended for failure to appear at their away games; the club was unable to finance away games and could only make it to those games within walking distance. An appeal was lodged with the British club, and appeals to others to support their predicament. Club legend Paul Lake spearheaded a campaign to have the public provide what was needed. Among the donations were: a Toyota Coaster mini-bus, equipment, uniforms and textbooks. The club took advantage of the vehicle to raise income by hiring it out to the public when not needed by the team.

Honours

Cups
 Sierra Leonean FA Youth Cup
 Winners (1): 2008

References

External links
 Official site
 

Football clubs in Sierra Leone
Sport in Freetown
Manchester City F.C.